is a professional Go player.

Biography 
Kudo turned professional in 1955 and was promoted to 9 dan in 1976. Although he did not win many tournaments, he was known for teaching Go to many people, even if they were just starting to learn, or were about to turn 1 dan. He succeeded the late Masao Kato as president of the International Go Federation in 2005.

Promotion record

Titles & runners-up

External links
GoBase Profile
Nihon Ki-in Profile (Japanese)

1940 births
Japanese Go players
Living people
People from Hirosaki